Vladislav Sergeyevich Aksyutenko (born 28 April 1983) is a Russian professional football player. He plays for FC Novokuznetsk.

Club career
He made his Russian Football National League debut for FC Dynamo Barnaul on 27 March 2008 in a game against FC Ural Yekaterinburg.

Honours
 Russian Professional Football League Zone East Top Goalscorer: 2015–16 (12 goals).

References

External links
 

1983 births
People from Rubtsovsk
Living people
Russian footballers
FC Okean Nakhodka players
FC Dynamo Barnaul players
FC Chernomorets Novorossiysk players
FC SKA-Khabarovsk players
FC Tyumen players
FC Sakhalin Yuzhno-Sakhalinsk players
Association football forwards
FC Orenburg players
FC Novokuznetsk players
Sportspeople from Altai Krai